Farah Nur  (1862 – 1932) was a famed Somali poet and warrior of the Arap Isaaq clan.

Poetry
Farah's poetry had deep meaning and he was known for his eloquence and ability to cover a breadth of topics.

Aakhiru Sabaan
The poem Farah is most remembered for today is the Aakhiru Sabaan or The End of the World and its first four lines have immortalized the poet in the Somali conscious. An anti-colonial rallying cry Farah lists the colonizers and calls upon Somalis to stand up.

Afar Iyo Afar
Farah's Arap and the Saad Musa had come to an agreement after a long period of fighting. The first to speak from amongst the Saad Musa was the poet Maxamed Bulxan and he decided to surprise the Arap with a geeraar. Farah being the preeminent fighter and poet from amongst the Arap felt compelled to respond and composed this famous response on the spot.

Nabadshe and the Wadaad
Aadan Jugle, a Habr Yunis man, had a nephew named Nabadshe who was from the Arap. Nabadshe had asked his uncle for the hand of one of his daughters. Jugle agreed and said to return in two years with fifty camels as mahr. Nabadshe had returned and was shocked to find that the girl had been married and Jugle stipulated the same price to another man. He confronted his uncle and Jugle apologized and promised his next daughter in a years time and set the same mahr. Nabadshe again came a year later to find this daughter married. Jugle was reprimanded by the elders and Nabadshe was promised a third daughter and praised for his patience. Again Jugle would marry off his daughter and got the same fifty camels. Heartbroken and betrayed, Nabadshe took a spear and set out to the home of his uncle, ultimately stabbing the old man and killing him. Following this Nabadshe would be caught by British authorities and sentenced to death in court for the murder. The judge asked if Nabadshe had anything to say for himself after the sentence and he stood and recited this gabay. 

A Wadaad had been called to reconcile the Arap and Habr Yunis and instead decided to recite a gabay filled with insults and curses, and most uncharacteristic for a religious man, the Wadaad was a cousin of the recently killed Jugle. Farah Nur heard of the gabay from the Wadaad and reprimanded him. Following Farah's words no one would pray behind the Wadaad again and he became outcast.

Hadduu Saakimi Waayona
Unlike their larger brothers, the Habr Awal, Habr Yunis and Habr Je'lo, the Arap were unable to break from Eidagale-led Isaaq Sultanate and decided to stand and change this situation. Led by Farah Nur the Arap crowned him as Sultan and raised arms against the Eidagale and Sultan Deria Hassan.  

Composing this poem entitled The Limits of Submission Farah speaks of the conflict and intolerance to the subordinate status to the Sultan.

See also
Deria Hassan
Kite Fiqi
Salaan Carrabey
Hussein Hasan
Isaaq Sultanate

References

19th-century Somalian people
20th-century Somalian people
20th-century poets
19th-century poets
Somaliland poets
Ethnic Somali people
Somalian Muslims